Safietou Sagna (born 11 April 1994) is a Senegalese footballer who plays as a midfielder for French club Bourges Foot 18 and captains the Senegal women's national team.

Club career
Sagna has played for Casa Sports, Lycée Ameth Fall and US Parcelles Assainies in Senegal.

International career
Sagna capped for Senegal at senior level during the 2012 African Women's Championship.

References

External links

1994 births
Living people
People from Ziguinchor Region
Senegalese women's footballers
Women's association football midfielders
Bourges Foot 18 players
Senegal women's international footballers
Senegalese expatriate footballers
Senegalese expatriate sportspeople in France
Expatriate women's footballers in France